Vyacheslav Aleksandrovich Kartashov (born 24 August 1966) is a former Russian professional football player.

Club career
He made his Russian Football National League debut for FC Irtysh Omsk on 6 May 1992 in a game against FC Selenga Ulan-Ude. He played 6 seasons in the FNL for Irtysh.

Honours
 Russian First League Zone East top scorer: 1992 (19 goals).

External links
 

1966 births
Living people
Soviet footballers
Russian footballers
Association football forwards
Association football defenders
FC Irtysh Omsk players